Bait and bleed is a military strategy described by international relations theorist John J. Mearsheimer in his book on offensive realism, The Tragedy of Great Power Politics (2001). The aim is to induce rival states to engage in a protracted war of attrition against each other "so that they bleed each other white", while the baiter who encouraged the conflict remains on the sidelines and maintains its military strength.

Mearsheimer cites as an example Russia's efforts to provoke Austria and Prussia into war with France shortly after the French Revolution, evidenced by Catherine the Great's statement to her secretary in 1791: "I am racking my brains in order to push the courts of Vienna and Berlin into French affairs. ... There are reasons I cannot talk about; I want to get them involved in that business to have my hands free. I have much unfinished business, and it's necessary for them to be kept busy and out of my way."

Bloodletting
Mearsheimer describes a similar strategy which he calls "bloodletting", which does not involve incitement or baiting by a third party. When a state's rivals have already gone to war independently, the aim is to encourage the conflict to continue as long as possible to let the rival states weaken or "bleed" each other's military strength, while the bloodletting party stays out of the fighting.

This strategy is exemplified in United States senator Harry S. Truman's statement in 1941 regarding the invasion of the Soviet Union by Nazi Germany and its allies, Italy, Hungary, Finland, and Romania: "If we see that Germany is winning, we ought to help Russia, and if Russia is winning we ought to help Germany, and that way let them kill as many as possible, although I don't want to see Hitler victorious under any circumstances."

Another example of this strategy was Soviet Russia's withdrawal from World War I while the fighting in Europe between Germany and the remaining Allies continued. In his report to the Third All-Russian Congress of Workers', Soldiers' and Peasants Deputies' Soviets in 1918, Vladimir Lenin argued that by withdrawing from the conflict, "we rid ourselves ... of both imperialistic groups fighting each other. We can take advantage of their strife ... and use that period when our hands are free to develop and strengthen the Socialist Revolution."

See also
 Attrition warfare
 Divide and rule
 John J. Mearsheimer
 Power politics
 Realism in international relations
 Realpolitik
 Perfidious Albion
 Stalin's speech of 19 August 1939

References

Attrition warfare
International relations
Military strategy
Political science terminology